Nancy Theresa Lord (February 8, 1952 – February 14, 2022) was an American attorney and medical researcher who was the vice-presidential candidate of the Libertarian Party in the 1992 presidential election, as the running-mate of Andre Marrou. Marrou and Lord placed fourth in the popular vote with 290,087 votes (0.3%).
Lord was the Libertarian candidate for Mayor of the District of Columbia in 1990. She also unsuccessfully ran for Nye County, Nevada District Attorney as a Republican in 2010.

Lord completed undergraduate and M.D. degrees at the University of Maryland. She earned her J.D. degree from Georgetown University Law Center. Until 1983, Lord was employed by Abbott Laboratories, where she authored the successful new drug application for benzodiazepine hypnotic ("ProSom"). After leaving Abbott, Lord worked as an independent consultant in the areas of pharmaceutical development, medical malpractice, and toxicology.

She served on the boards of directors for NORML and for the Fully Informed Jury Association and wrote the introduction to the original edition of You and the Police by Boston T. Party.

Lord died on February 14, 2022, in Show Low, Arizona, following a bout with COVID-19.

References

External links 
 Our Campaigns Electoral History 
 

1952 births
2022 deaths
1992 United States vice-presidential candidates
20th-century American politicians
20th-century American women politicians
21st-century American women
Abbott Laboratories people
American medical researchers
Deaths from the COVID-19 pandemic in Arizona
Female candidates for Vice President of the United States
Georgetown University Law Center alumni
Libertarian Party (United States) vice presidential nominees
Nevada Libertarians
Nevada Republicans
People from Pahrump, Nevada
University of Maryland, College Park alumni
Washington, D.C., Libertarians